Courtney Jones may refer to:

Courtney Jones (figure skater) (born 1933), British ice dancer
Courtney Jones (footballer) (born 2000), Australian rules footballer
Courtney Jones (soccer) (born 1990), American soccer player
Courtney Dunbar Jones, American judge on the U.S. Tax Court